The Lonesome Boatman is a 1969 album by the Irish folk music duo Finbar & Eddie Furey. It is best known for its title track which is played hauntingly on a tin whistle, as well as its version of the traditional ballad Carnlough Bay.

In recent times the song has featured at football matches, most notably performed by fans of Glasgow team, Celtic FC.

In 2017, Dropkick Murphys released a cover of "The Lonesome Boatman" on their album 11 Short Stories of Pain & Glory.

1969 albums
The Fureys albums